Kemetic Orthodoxy is a new religious movement based on Kemeticism, which is a reconstruction of ancient Egyptian religion. It was founded in 1988 by Tamara Siuda, who remains its current Nisut or Pharaoh.

Despite its name, Siuda considers Kemetic Orthodoxy to be a cultic idea rather than a revealed religion. Members do not adhere to a scripture, prioritizing the practice of “correct”action, ritual and liturgy. Worship often takes place in shrines, which exist in both public and personal forms. The main temple is in Joliet, Illinois, with a variety of state shrines maintained by priests throughout the world.

Five basic tenets guide the faith of members: Belief in upholding ma'at, belief in Netjer (the supreme being), akhu (ancestor) veneration, participation in and respect for the community, and acknowledgment of Siuda as the Nisut. Members of the faith are known as "Shemsu".

Kemetic Orthodoxy has been the subject of study by both sociologists and Egyptologists. It is considered notable for its size and 'primacy on the web', and its influence on Kemeticism in general, with many other Kemetic groups splintering off of or otherwise defining themselves in relation to it. The presence of a central authority and emphasis on tradition in Kemetic Orthodoxy is unusual among religions which are mainly organized online and runs contrary to what early theorists have expected of religion on the internet.

Main beliefs

Kemetic Orthodoxy claims to be based on the religious practices of Ancient Egypt.  However, it is not a reconstructionist religion - while it seeks to base itself on primary Egyptian sources, it also includes rites invented by Siuda and incorporates elements from other modern African Traditional Religions and African diaspora religions.

It has five principal tenets, often described as four main tenets held together by a fundamental belief in upholding ma'at. The organisation does not consider these tenets as dogma. Instead, they report that these form the basis of what most members of Kemetic Orthodoxy believe, but what each individual member believes may vary. The religion does not require that all members practice in exactly the same way, and different views are looked upon as merely different ways of understanding God, or Netjer.

Belief in upholding Ma'at
In the Ancient Egyptian religion, Ma'at refers to both the concept of truth, justice and balance, and the goddess who personifies these concepts. The furtherance of Ma'at is central to Kemetic Orthodox practice. The rituals and prayers that members undertake are seen as contributing to the propagation of Ma'at, though they are also encouraged to take material action on social justice issues. The House of Netjer has made public statements condemning police violence and anti-immigration policy in the USA.

Belief in Netjer (the supreme being)
Kemetic Orthodoxy professes that the Ancient Egyptian gods are manifestations of a supreme being they call Netjer, translated as "divine power". As such, they are referred to as the "Names" of Netjer. Despite the House of Netjer's website referring to this belief as monolatry, it is more accurately characterized as inclusive monotheism. The Names are understood to be personal deities, impersonal forces, and metaphorical concepts simultaneously. It is additionally understood that Names may merge and identify with each other, resulting in the various historically attested syncretizations, such as Sekhmet-Hathor. Siuda believes that they manifest this way to 'permit themselves to be intellectually understood by humans'.

Members report receiving communication from Netjer in the form of dreams, omens and divination, as well as sensing its presence in natural phenomena.

Akhu (Ancestor) veneration
Members of Kemetic Orthodoxy believe that their ancestors reside in the Duat as Akhu. As Akhu have already experienced living as humans, it is thought that they can give valuable advice and support regarding things related to their descendants' daily lives. Members believe that honoring their Akhu ensures that they remain happy and satisfied in the Duat.

Ways in which members believe that they can honor their Akhu vary, ranging from the practice of keeping household ancestor shrines, on which offerings can be made, to writing letters to the Akhu and posting them on a website designed for such a purpose, similar to the practice of writing letters to the dead found in Ancient Egypt.

In Kemetic Orthodoxy, Akhu generally fall into three categories:  Family, National, and Associational.

 Family Akhu represent deceased family members such as parents, siblings, children, etc.
 National Akhu are associated with the organisation of Kemetic Orthodoxy. A parallel from Ancient Egypt would be the veneration of a pharaoh or celebrated commoner.
 Associational Akhu are any other Akhu associated with an individual.  They may be through actual contact by the Akhu, through a common interest, or any other reason for the bond to be formed. Examples may include celebrities, or political leaders.

Participation in and respect for the community
Members are encouraged to consider Kemetic Orthodoxy a sort of extended family. The House of Netjer offers spiritual counseling, discussion groups, and fellowship chats over IRC and on their forum to facilitate this. The Kemetic Orthodox also emphasizes the importance of family in the personal lives of adherents. The faith encourages increased relationships and understanding of an individual with their family members. This concept is related to the principle of Akhu veneration.

Acknowledgment of Siuda as the Nisut
The acknowledgment of Tamara L. Siuda as spiritual leader, or Nisut-Bity, is also central to Kemetic Orthodoxy, as the religion consists of her teachings and leadership. Additionally, adherents believe that the current incarnation of the "kingly ka", or invested spirit of Heru, is co-resident in the Nisut. Upon her coronation in 1996, the Nisut was believed by her followers to have become the 196th Pharaoh of the religion of Ancient Egypt. The Pharaoh in Ancient Egypt was not only the political ruler of Kemet, but also the direct religious contact between the people and Netjer, or God.  Adherents of Kemetic Orthodoxy believe that Siuda fills only the religious aspect of this title and position. They do not worship her as a God herself, but ascribe to her a 'semi-divine status'.

The role of the Nisut includes performing daily rituals to enforce ma'at and dispel isfet (the opposite of ma'at), regularly praying for the members of the faith, and advising her followers in religious matters.

Worship

Worship within Kemetic Orthodoxy takes many forms. There are official, state rituals performed by the priesthood and Nisut of Kemetic Orthodoxy; there is Senut, the daily rite performed by members of the temple; and there are other, more personalized forms of worship that are left to the individual practitioner. Kemetic Orthodoxy additionally follows a festival calendar derived from historical sources, which is calibrated to the same celestial phenomenon as ancient calendars, but which uses the position of the modern "royal residence" at the organization's main temple and headquarters in Joliet.

Group worship

There are several different kinds of group rituals present in Kemetic Orthodoxy. These may be held entirely in person, or may be simulcast via Internet Relay Chat. Rituals held in this fashion are celebrated fully in person at the Truth and the Mother Shrine, while a priest describes what is happening to participants gathered in the chat room.  During certain points, the individuals participating via simulcast may be asked to perform a ritual action at home, and will be asked to notify the priest transcribing the event when they have done so.

Siuda notes, however, that "Kemetic Orthodoxy is a religion on the internet, not an internet religion". This is reflected in the existence of off-line gatherings and rituals. Members of Kemetic Orthodoxy gather at Tawy House in August for the Kemetic New Year, Wep Ronpet. As the largest gathering, it is the best example of an event held by the Kemetic Orthodox off-line. It includes rituals, fellowship, lectures and workshops.

An example of a form of group worship for the Kemetic Orthodox religion, as noted by Krogh & Pillifant (2004) is that of Saq. Saq is an ancient form of ritual possession in which a specialized priest is believed to become entirely possessed by a deity. Through this venue, the deity speaks with members of Kemetic Orthodoxy and accepts offerings. Saqu (the plural form of Saq) may be held entirely in person, or may be simulcast via the internet, where on-line participants send messages to the attending priest, who reads them out loud to the deity in possession. It is described as being "one of the most immediate and profound experiences of Kemetic Orthodoxy".

Personal/Individual worship

Individuals worship in many different ways.  From specific rituals to spur of the moment prayers, worship is an ongoing process.  The following are some examples of personal worship and rituals.

Personal shrines
Most members of Kemetic Orthodoxy, as part of their devotional practices, set up household shrines to the deities they worship. The basic necessities of such a shrine include an incense burner or diffuser, a lamp or candle, and a place to put offerings. Shrines may contain representations of certain deities, or they may have a more general focus. They often contain objects which have been offered to a deity or deities. The individual uses this shrine to perform various rituals including the Senut daily rite. Individuals may honor deities to whom they are particularly called, as well as deities in festival, deities associated with the time of year, or even deities of whom they have a special request.

In addition to these personal deity-centered shrines, members of Kemetic Orthodoxy are encouraged to set up shrines to their ancestors or Akhu, as part of venerating their ancestors. These shrines often contain mementos of individuals close to the member who have died, and are the central focus for ancestor veneration in the member's home.

Senut ritual

Senut, meaning "shrine", is a rite that was established by Siuda for members of Kemetic Orthodoxy as a means of formal worship in a framework where formal temples and shrines for every region were lacking. The Senut ritual is composed of various rites, and is a "fully functional ritual for individual use yet containing all of the necessary elements of all Kemetic ritual, whether practiced by one or a thousand."

Other personal worship

Aside from the Senut ritual, there are few other personal ritual forms of worship that exist within Kemetic Orthodoxy. Members often develop their own informal practices, which vary from person to person. Informal prayer and worship are encouraged as a necessary part of the faith.

Even though, in Kemetic Orthodoxy, individual worship is a very important aspect of one's belief, often the experiences are shared with other members of the religion. This shared experience is intended to help strengthen the bonds between members and Netjer.  Many individuals use the creation of art as a tool in worship.  These paintings, drawings, sculpture, jewelry, poetry, music, dance, and storytelling are often shared with other members.

History

Kemetic Orthodoxy grew out of the personal teachings of Siuda. The temple began in 1988, when she claimed to have experienced a series of visions during her initiation as a Wiccan priestess. She left her Wiccan lodge to try and recover as much as she could about ancient Egyptian religion as it was practised, pursuing a degree in Egyptology to that end. She started a small study and worship group at that time, which gradually grew in membership. In 1993, the group was federally recognized as a religious entity and changed its name from the House of Bast to the House of Netjer. The temple was granted tax-exempt status in 1999.

In 2003 the House of Netjer purchased a building to be the permanent home of the Temple in Joliet, Illinois.  The building contains the main state shrine for followers of Kemetic Orthodoxy (The Truth and the Mother Shrine).  It also includes the offices of some members of the priesthood, and the permanent living quarters and office of Siuda.

Community 
The House of Netjer community is a global community with members in multiple countries. Because of the difficulty of maintaining contact with people from around the world, the members are divided into geographical regions. Some regions have frequent "meet-ups" where members gather for socialization, fellowship, and/or worship. Some gatherings invite non-members to meet the membership.

Gatherings also take place in on-line chats of various formats. Like off-line events, on-line events vary widely in their format. The most common formats are fellowship events, with little or no structure, and educational events, where one or more member leads a group discussion on a topic of interest.

Membership

There are two classes of membership in Kemetic Orthodoxy, Remetj and Shemsu. Remetj, translated as royal subjects, are referred to as "friends of the faith". Some Remetj are members who have taken the free online group introductory course and decided to not yet become full members, but wish to remain affiliated with Kemetic Orthodoxy. Remetj may also include those who plan on becoming members in the future, but have not yet done so, as well as individuals who were born into the faith. An adherent of Kemetic Orthodoxy may also be referred to as a Remetj if they had, at one time, held the status of full member, but no longer hold such a position.

Shemsu, translated as followers, are individuals who have decided to become full members of the House of Netjer temple. This requires having previously been a Remetj (to take the introductory course) and partaking in a ritual to become a full member.

This ritual consists of two parts. The first part is the determination of the convert's "Parent" and "Beloved" gods. The Kemetic Orthodox believe that the Parent god(s) create the ba, or eternal soul, of the candidate; while the Beloved gods, of whom there can be any number, have taken a personal interest in helping the individual through their life. This rite is called the "Ritual Parent Divination", or RPD, and is a geomantic divination that is performed on the convert's behalf by Siuda. The results of this ritual may be relayed in a face-to-face meeting between Siuda and the Remetj, or via telephone and internet.

The second half of this ritual is a community gathering of Remetj and Shemsu, known as Shemsu naming. During this gathering, individuals who wish to become Shemsu, and have undergone the Rite of Parent Divination, are announced to those gathered (alternatively, the announcement may take the form of a public post on social media.) This announcement repeats the results of the Rite of Parent Divination and assigns each individual a religious name. This religious name is believed to be created by an individual's Parent god(s), and often has many meanings.  After everyone has been announced, all Shemsu, new and old, are charged with a set of vows, from which the following excerpt is taken:

According to House of Netjer, Shemsu namings occur both annually in person during the faith's yearly major retreat, held in August, and simulcast on the internet at various intervals throughout the year.

A subset of Shemsu are those who have undergone the initiation rite known as the Weshem-ib or "testing of the heart". In this process, members take special vows to not only place Kemetic Orthodoxy before other religious practices, but to work to serve the religion and its members. These responsibilities are in addition to the regular oaths taken by Shemsu. A Shemsu who has completed the Weshem-ib is called a Shemsu-Ankh. All priests in the Kemetic Orthodoxy faith must undertake this rite.

Priesthood

The priesthood of Kemetic Orthodoxy is composed of both lay (or non-ordained) and ordained priests.  The Kemetic Orthodoxy religion uses the term priest for both males and females.  A priest's primary responsibility is to the members, not to the Names of Netjer.

A W'ab priest, translated as purity priest, is a lay priest of the Kemetic Orthodox faith.  They are Shemsu-Ankh members who have undertaken additional training and oaths of service to the members of the faith.  As a W'ab priest, the member's main responsibility is overseeing and helping in issues of purity. A W'ab priest is also responsible for maintaining an official shrine and performing daily rituals there.  Some of these shrines are open to visiting members, especially for specific rituals and/or celebrations.

An Imakhu (plural Imakhiu), translated as revered one, is the only type of priest in the modern Kemetic Faith who is an ordained priest. They are given legal credentials and the right to use the title of "Reverend" outside of the Kemetic Orthodox faith.  All Imakhu serve as W'ab priests as well.

Imakhu are responsible for assisting the Nisut in maintaining and supporting the faithful, such as providing counseling (if they have been so trained), performing weddings, supporting and instructing Remetj, Shemsu, and Beginners, and acting as the Nisut's official representatives. They are also responsible for overseeing the administrative requirements of running the House of Netjer temple, including finances, correspondence, managing time and resources, reporting to membership and Siuda, teaching, maintaining and updating the Kemetic Orthodox internet presence, scheduling appointments and trips for Siuda, personal security, and many other jobs.

An Imakhu who has performed exceptional service may receive the title of Kai-Imakhu, the prefix "Kai" translated as "exalted". Kai-Imakhu, in addition to their regular duties as an Imakhu, are also responsible overseeing the other Imakhu.

Tawy House Retreat Center

The Tawy House Retreat Center organises religious and study retreats for members of Kemetic Orthodoxy.  These include the week-long celebrations of Wep Ronpet or Kemetic New Year's Day (early August).

The Truth and the Mother Shrine is the main state shrine of the followers of the Kemetic Orthodox Religion.  Included and associated with this shrine are a variety of individual and group deity shrines, such as the Akhu shrine and Nisut shrine. These shrines often rotate through the year based on current festivals and the needs of the membership. The Truth and the Mother Shrine is also linked to various priest shrines around the world.

The Imhotep Kemetic Orthodox Seminary is a school devoted to the theological study of the Kemetic Orthodox religion. It offers introductory and intermediate classes in the Middle Egyptian language, as well as a course in Kemetic protective magic, known as "Sau". These courses are optional for all members of the faith.

The Udjat Foundation was an affiliated non-profit organization dedicated specifically to children's welfare causes.

Kemetic Orthodoxy and other religions

Kemetic Orthodoxy does not have any official relationship with any other religions. Other modern Kemetic groups, such as Akhet Hwt-Hrw, Per Ankh and Per Heh, do not claim affiliation with or share the beliefs of Kemetic Orthodoxy.

Religious Pluralism

As Kemetic Orthodoxy does not teach that it is the only religious path that one can or should follow, some members practice more than one religious belief. Members are asked to keep other beliefs and practices separate from their Kemetic beliefs and practices. If a member has gone through the Weshem-ib or "testing of the heart" ritual, they are asked to place their Kemetic practices and beliefs first, and other religious thoughts second. No Kemetic Orthodox member is obliged to participate in this rite, though it is a mandatory prerequisite for priesthood.

Proselytism

The Kemetic Orthodox religion does not ask its members to seek converts.

References and notes

Offline references
 Dawson, Lorne & Cowan, Douglas. Religion Online: Finding Faith on the Internet. Routledge, 2004. 

 Krogh, Marilyn. & Pillifant, Brooke Ashley. "Kemetic Orthodoxy: Ancient Egyptian Religion on the Internet: A Research Note." Sociology of Religion 65.2(2004): 167-175.
 Siuda, Tamara L. The Ancient Egyptian Prayerbook. Azrael, 2005.

External links
Kemetic Orthodoxy main site
The House of Netjer forums and gallery
Tawy House
Imhotep Kemetic Orthodox Seminary
The Udjat Foundation

Kemetism
Modern pagan organizations based in the United States
Religious organizations established in 1988
Modern pagan organizations established in the 1980s